Anne Focan (born 18 November 1961 in Namur) is a Belgian sport shooter. She competed in trap shooting events at the 1996 and 2000 Summer Olympics.

Olympic results

References

1961 births
Living people
Trap and double trap shooters
Belgian female sport shooters
Shooters at the 1996 Summer Olympics
Shooters at the 2000 Summer Olympics
Olympic shooters of Belgium
Sportspeople from Namur (city)
20th-century Belgian women